Midoro Dam  is an earthfill dam located in Mie Prefecture in Japan. The dam is used for irrigation. The dam impounds about 20  ha of land when full and can store 1291 thousand cubic meters of water. The construction of the dam was started on 1953 and completed in 1970.

See also
List of dams in Japan

References

Dams in Mie Prefecture